Rochia maxima is a species of sea snail, a marine gastropod mollusk in the family Tegulidae.

Distribution
This marine species occurs off the Fiji Islands and Indo-Malaysia.

Description

The height of the shell attains 95 mm, its diameter also 95 mm.
The shell is less ponderous than Tectus niloticus. Its form is strictly conical. The whorls of the spire are decidedly plicate or tuberculate, planulate. The body whorl is not dilated at the periphery. The flat base is concentrically grooved. The columella is less oblique than in the type.

This species was first considered an arrested or primitive form of Tectus niloticus, as in the conic form, flat, lirate base, and sculptured spire, it exactly resembles
an immature specimen of the latter species. But in 1869 Dr. von Martens considered them different species.

References

External links
 Philippi, R. A. (1842-1850). Abbildungen und Beschreibungen neuer oder wenig gekannter Conchylien unter Mithülfe mehrerer deutscher Conchyliologen. Cassel, T. Fischer: Vol. 1: 1-20
 Williams, S. T. (2012). Advances in molecular systematics of the vetigastropod superfamily Trochoidea. Zoologica Scripta. 41(6): 571-595

maxima
Gastropods described in 1844